Crazy Horses is the fourth studio album by the American singing group The Osmonds, released in 1972. It reached number 14 on the Billboard Top LPs chart on December 23, 1972.  Two singles were released in support of the album, "Hold Her Tight" and "Crazy Horses", both of which reached number 14 on the Billboard Hot 100 singles chart. It was certified Gold by the RIAA on January 24, 1973.

Building upon the sound of the band's previous album, Phase III, Crazy Horses is a hard rock and heavy metal album. Cited as particularly significant in the evolution of heavy metal music, author and music journalist Chuck Eddy ranked Crazy Horses as #66 in his 1991 book "The Five Hundred Best Heavy Metal Albums in the Universe". Merrill was the lead singer on most songs as he was the lead singer for the Osmonds. Jay was the lead on Crazy Horses  with Alan, Wayne and Donny each taking a  portions of the lead vocals on some of the songs.

Track listing 
All songs written and composed by Alan Osmond, Merrill Osmond and Wayne Osmond except where noted.

Side 1
 "Hold Her Tight" – 3:18 (March 17, 1972)
 "Utah" (Merrill Osmond) – 2:20 (June 23, 1972)
 "Girl" (Alan Osmond, Merrill Osmond) – 3:38 (March 17, 1972)
 "What Could It Be" (Alan Osmond) – 3:20 (March 17, 1972)
 "We All Fall Down" (Alan Osmond, Jay Osmond, Merrill Osmond, Wayne Osmond) – 2:55 (June 23, 1972)
 "And You Love Me" (Wayne Osmond) – 3:40 (March 17, 1972)

Side 2
 "Crazy Horses" – 2:40 (June 23, 1972)
 "Life is Hard Enough Without Goodbyes" – 3:45 (June 23, 1972)
 "Hey, Mr. Taxi" – 3:05 (June 23, 1972)
 "That's My Girl" (Alan Osmond) – 3:12 (May 3, 1972)
 "Julie" – 3:14 (March 17, 1972)
 "Big Finish" – 0:18 (June 23, 1972)

Personnel
Producer: Alan Osmond, Michael Lloyd
Arranger (horns): Jim Horn (Tracks 2, 5, 7, 9)
Engineer: Ed Greene
Recorded at MGM Recording Studios

Charts

Album

Singles

Certifications

References

1972 albums
Hard rock albums by American artists
Heavy metal albums by American artists
The Osmonds albums
MGM Records albums